Minuthodes is a genus of beetles in the family Carabidae, containing the following species:

 Minuthodes atratus Baehr, 2006 
 Minuthodes biplagiatus Baehr, 1998 
 Minuthodes brachyderus (Chaudoir, 1869) 
 Minuthodes demarzi Baehr, 1989 
 Minuthodes froggatti (W.J.Macleay, 1888) 
 Minuthodes irregularis Darlington, 1968 
 Minuthodes laticeps (Chaudoir, 1869) 
 Minuthodes lineellus (Chaudoir, 1869) 
 Minuthodes metallicus Darlington, 1968 
 Minuthodes minimus (W.J.Macleay, 1864) 
 Minuthodes multisetosus Baehr, 1998 
 Minuthodes niger (Emden, 1937) 
 Minuthodes papuanus (Sloane, 1917) 
 Minuthodes queenslandicus (Sloane, 1917) 
 Minuthodes rectimargo Baehr, 2006 
 Minuthodes regularis Darlington, 1968 
 Minuthodes serratus Baehr, 1989 
 Minuthodes sexualis Darlington, 1968 
 Minuthodes simplex Darlington, 1968 
 Minuthodes trimaculatus Baehr, 2001 
 Minuthodes walfordi Baehr, 1994

References

Lebiinae